Hyperbionycidae is a family of crustaceans belonging to the order Calanoida.

Genera:
 Hyperbionyx Ohtsuka, Roe & Boxshall, 1993
 Lamiantennula Markhaseva & Schulz, 2006

References

Calanoida